Daniel and Miriam Pease House is a historic home located at Oswego in Oswego County, New York.  It is a five bay, two story frame Federal style residence with a one-story rear wing. Also on the property is a three-story timber framed barn.  Its owners, Daniel and Miriam Pease, were noted abolitionists and the house is documented as having been used as a way station on the Underground Railroad.

It was listed on the National Register of Historic Places in 2002.

References

Houses on the National Register of Historic Places in New York (state)
Federal architecture in New York (state)
Houses completed in 1826
Houses in Oswego County, New York
Houses on the Underground Railroad
1826 establishments in New York (state)
National Register of Historic Places in Oswego County, New York